Leland Martin (born February 20, 1957, Success, Missouri) is an American country singer. Martin was one of nine children; his grandmother and father were both country singers. He held jobs as a truck driver, house painter, and in a sawmill before signing with Rival Records, who issued his debut album in 1998. Follow-up albums appeared in 2002, 2005, and 2008.

Discography

Albums

Singles

Music videos

References

1957 births
Living people
People from Texas County, Missouri
American country singer-songwriters
Singer-songwriters from Missouri
Country musicians from Missouri